Mehdi Shafaeddin (born 12 July 1945) is a Swiss Iranian development economist with a D.Phil. degree from Oxford University. He was affiliated with the University of Neuchatel, Switzerland, until 2011  and previously served as Senior Economist, Executive Direction and Management, United Nations Conference on Trade and Development.

Publications

Books
Competitiveness and Development: Myth and Realities (2004)
Does trade openness favour or hinder industrialization and development (2006)

Articles
Policies for industrial learning in China and Mexico

References

Swiss economists
1945 births
Living people
Place of birth missing (living people)
Date of birth missing (living people)
Alumni of the University of Oxford